Penang Outer Ring Road (PORR) is a planned expressway in George Town, Penang, Malaysia. If constructed, it will connect Gelugor in the south, near Penang Bridge to Tanjung Bungah in the north. After a mid-term review of the Ninth Malaysia Plan, this project, together with Penang Monorail has been postponed indefinitely.

History

The concession was awarded to Peninsular Metroworks Sdn Bhd (PMW), a company formed in 1996 but the company was not able to get the project off the ground. PMW was formed by Nadi Senandung Sdn Bhd (55%), Yayasan Bumiputera Pulau Pinang Bhd (35%) and an individual. It was reported in early May 2007 that Malaysian Resources Corporation Berhad (MRCB) will become the lead shareholder of the company and will start the construction of the road.

About 60 percent of the 17 km highway will be elevated. Development cost is expected to be RM1.02 billion.

List of Interchanges

Main link

Gurney link

External links
The Penang Outer Ring Road (PORR)
MP Chow Kon Yeow blogged on PORR
A critical view of why concessionaire's weakness delayed PORR

Expressways in Malaysia
Expressways and highways in Penang
Northern Corridor Economic Region
Proposed roads in Malaysia